Polycentropus is a genus of tube maker caddisflies in the family Polycentropodidae. There are more than 190 described species in Polycentropus.

See also
 List of Polycentropus species

References

Further reading

External links

 

Trichoptera genera
Articles created by Qbugbot
Trichoptera